David Ish-Horowicz FRS (born 1948) is a British scientist.  He is currently a Professor of Cell and Developmental Biology at University College London (since 2013). Between 1987 and 2013, he was a Principal Scientist and Head of the Developmental Genetics Laboratory at Cancer Research UK  (formerly Imperial Cancer Research Fund). He was elected a Fellow of the Royal Society in 2002  and won the Waddington Medal from the British Society for Developmental Biology in 2007.  He is a former member of the Scientific Advisory Committee of the Lister Institute of Preventive Medicine. He has been a member of the European Molecular Biology Organization since 1985.

Family
His father was Moshe Ish-Horowicz (b. August 22, 1922; d. February 27, 2008), a prominent leader in the development of Reform Judaism in Manchester.

Education
He was educated at Manchester Grammar School and Pembroke College, Cambridge (BA, 1969), and researched at the MRC Laboratory of Molecular Biology while at Darwin College, Cambridge (PhD, 1973), and was a postdoctoral fellow in Basle.

References

1948 births
Alumni of Darwin College, Cambridge
Fellows of the Royal Society
British Jews
Jewish scientists
Living people